Adapazarı station is the main terminal railway station in the city of Adapazarı. It is the eastern terminus of the Haydarpaşa-Adapazarı Regional, the most heavily used rail service line in Turkey and second most in service frequency. The station is located directly in the city center. The other two stations serving Adapazarı are Mithatpaşa railway station, located in southwestern Adapazarı and Arifye railway station, located in Adapazarı's southern suburb. The station is situated on the north end of the Adapazarı Branch, which connects to the Istanbul––Ankara Main Line at Arifye.

The station was opened on November, 1899 by the Anatolian Railway (CFOA). The railway intended to continue to the railway to Bolu and then Ankara, but this never happened and the station became a terminal. In 1969, the line was electrified and new improved regional service was added to İstanbul.

The station is used for storing rail cars, but currently it's the main station for Ada Express since 2019.

References

External links
https://web.archive.org/web/20090522065415/http://www.tcdd.gov.tr/yolcu/bolgesel.htm
http://www.trainsofturkey.com/w/pmwiki.php/History/CFOA
http://www.trainsofturkey.com/w/pmwiki.php/History/History

1899 establishments in the Ottoman Empire
Buildings and structures in Adapazarı
Railway stations in Sakarya Province
Railway stations opened in 1899
Adapazarı